Estahban County is in Fars province, Iran. The capital of the county is the city of Estahban. At the 2006 census, the county's population was 66,391 in 16,606 households. The following census in 2011 counted 66,172 people in 18,584 households. At the 2016 census, the county's population was 68,850 in 20,890 households.

Administrative divisions

The population history of Estahban County's administrative divisions over three consecutive censuses is shown in the following table. The latest census shows two districts, three rural districts, and three cities.

References

 

Counties of Fars Province